Steven J. Zipperstein (born 1950) is the Daniel E. Koshland Professor in Jewish Culture and History at Stanford University. Zipperstein earned his B.A. and Ph.D. at the University of California at Los Angeles.

In 1993 Zipperstein accepted an invitation to teach Jewish Studies for a semester at the Russian State University for the Humanities, Russia's main center for Archival Studies in Moscow.

Books
Pogrom: Kishinev and the Tilt of History (2018)
Rosenfeld's Lives: Fame, Oblivion, and the Furies of Writing (Yale University Press,2009)
The Worlds of S. An-sky: A Russian Jewish Intellectual at the Turn of the Century edited volume; co-edited with Gabriella Safran (Stanford University Press, 2006)
Imagining Russian Jewry: Memory, History, Identity (University of Washington Press, 1999)

References

Historians of Jews and Judaism
Jewish historians
American male non-fiction writers
Stanford University faculty
Kishinev pogrom
1950 births
Living people
20th-century American male writers